HMS Splendid was a Royal Navy nuclear-powered fleet submarine of the . From commissioning in 1979 to her decommission in 2004 she took part in many operations involving British forces around the globe.

Construction

HMS Splendid was ordered on 26 May 1976 as the sixth and last submarine of the Swiftsure class. The submarine was laid down at Vickers Shipbuilding Groups Barrow-in-Furness shipyard on 23 November 1977 and was launched on 5 October 1979 by Lady Eberle, wife of Admiral Sir James Eberle, then Commander-in-Chief Fleet. Splendid commissioned on 21 March 1981 under the command of Commander R. C. Lane-Nott.

Operational history
Her first major conflict came in 1982 during the Falklands War when Argentinian forces invaded the British Falkland Islands. Splendid was one of the first submarines to reach the islands, arriving mid-April, after sailing from Faslane. The captain of Splendid claimed, that running on the edge of the exclusion zone around the Falklands, declared by the UK government, he had the right in international law and approval from the British PM, to fire at 25 de Mayo, a couple of miles away within Argentine waters, and would have fired MK 8 torpedoes at 25 de Mayo, if he had confirmed his precise position. But just at the moment, he lost sight through the periscope of the carrier and was not immediately able to regain contact. The Naval Commander of the task force, Admiral Sandy Woodward, does not appear to be entirely clear, that Splendid had the right to fire, but says he established, against his prior view, that Splendid had orders to engage and approval of the PM. Splendid did however provide valuable reconnaissance to the British Task Force on Argentine aircraft movements. Splendids presence along with Conqueror effectively restricted the freedom of action of the Argentine Navy, which spent most of the war confined to port.

In November 1998, the Royal Navy attained initial operational capability for the American-built Tomahawk cruise missile with the missile's deployment aboard Splendid. In March 1999, Splendid fired Tomahawks in battle against Serbian targets when NATO forces intervened in the Kosovo War, becoming the first British submarine in the conflict to do so; she would fire 20 Tomahawks throughout the war. She again fired these weapons against Iraqi targets in the 2003 invasion of Iraq.

In July 2003 Splendid returned to her home at Faslane Naval Base on the River Clyde in Scotland. The youngest of the Swiftsure vessels, she was decommissioned in HMNB Devonport, Plymouth in 2004. Commander Burke was later awarded the OBE for his leadership of HMS Splendid in the Gulf.

Alleged involvement in the loss of Kursk

HMS Splendid was present, along with the US Navy submarines  and 
at the Russian war games during which the Russian submarine Kursk exploded and sank, resulting in the loss of that submarine and all 118 sailors and officers on board. Despite the conclusions of independent forensic inquiries and the eventual corroborating admission by the Russian Navy that the explosion was triggered by a faulty torpedo on board the Kursk, various conspiracy theories posit that Kursk was actually sunk by one of the US or British submarines.  This may partly stem from the Russian Navy's initial attempts to shunt away criticism of its failed efforts to rescue the surviving crew members from the ocean floor and of the generally poor condition of its own equipment, which was eventually found to be the cause of both the sinking and the failure of the Russian rescue attempts.  In the days immediately after the explosion, Russia suggested that the cause of the disaster was a collision with one of the US or British submarines present.  Though the accusation proved to be unfounded, conspiracy theorists have picked up on and elaborated it in various directions over time.

Commanding officers

Notes

Bibliography

External links 
 

 

Swiftsure-class submarines
Ships built in Barrow-in-Furness
Falklands War naval ships of the United Kingdom
1979 ships